Abdurrahman Mustafa (born 1964) is a Syrian Turkmen politician who is the incumbent president of the Syrian Turkmen Assembly, the umbrella organization of the Turkmen political movements in Syria, and the political leader of the Turkmen national movement of Syria. On 6 May 2018, he was elected as the head of the Syrian National Coalition.

Having served as one of the founder members of the Syrian Turkmen Platform, the predecessor political organization of Turkmen which was founded on 15 December 2012, Mustafa has been elected as the first Vice-President of the Syrian Turkmen Assembly following its foundation on 29 March 2013 with an official ceremony where Samir Hafız was elected as the first president of the assembly and back-then Turkish Prime Minister Recep Tayyip Erdoğan, back-then Minister of Foreign Affairs Ahmet Davutoğlu, back-then President of the National Coalition for Syrian Revolutionary and Opposition Forces Moaz al-Khatib and Turkish opposition politicians from Republican People's Party (CHP) and Nationalist Movement Party (MHP) have attended and gave speeches.

After the assembly's second general meeting, Mustafa has been elected as the president of the Syrian Turkmen Assembly with the majority of votes by 360 Syrian Turkmen delegates cast during the assembly elections on 10 May 2014. Politicians such as Turkish Minister of Foreign Affairs Ahmet Davutoğlu, President of the National Coalition for Syrian Revolutionary and Opposition Forces George Sabra, Erşat Hürmüzlü, Mehmet Şandır, Fuat Oktay and Ahmet Tuma have personally attended the meeting, while Turkish President Abdullah Gül, Turkish PM Recep Tayyip Erdoğan, Speaker of the Grand National Assembly Cemil Çiçek and leader of Republican People's Party, the Turkish main-opposition, Kemal Kılıçdaroğlu have sent speeches and congratulations which were addressed at the meeting. Since his assuming of the presidency, the activities of Mustafa and the assembly have intensified dramatically including the designation of Syrian Turkmen Brigades as the assembly's military wing, official declaration of the Syrian Turkmen flag, more coordinated attacks seeking the benefit of Turkmen and Syrian opposition and stronger coordination and cooperation with US and Turkey on the fight against ISIL on Azaz-Jarabulus line, becoming a key organization among which USA has close ties with and states as the "moderate rebels/opposition". As a result, Mustafa became a leading Turkmen leader and a key character of Syrian Civil War for Turkey in the first place.

He continues to serve as the president of the assembly, receiving open support from Turkey and the Gulf States, namely, Saudi Arabia (before the split) and Qatar, also receiving the support of United States with regards to being a part of "the moderate opposition".

Syrian Turkmen Assembly, under the leadership of Mustafa has been officially representing Syrian Turkmens in ongoing Geneva peace talks on Syria as an official diplomatic part of the Syrian Opposition with 1 to 3 Turkmen delegates, all headed by Abdurrahman Mustafa.

Life

Personal
Abdurrahman Mustafa was born in 1964, in the Turkmen village of Tell Hajar (Turkish:Taşlıhüyük) in the Aleppo Governorate of Syria. Mustafa is of Turkish origin and Syrian Turkmen ethnicity. He is married.

Education
Mustafa attended the University of Aleppo's School of Commerce and graduated in 1984 with a degree on Business/Management.

Business
Following the graduation, Mustafa worked for several companies. He received important international offices starting in 1988 when Mustafa was appointed as the Director of Finance and Administration of Libya for Kotaman A.Ş, later promoting to the Regional Director of company. Mustafa was involved in trade between 1993 and 1996 in Bulgaria and Turkey. In 1996, he started working for the Turkish Özkesoğlu Group and served in international offices such as Regional Director of Libya and later Syria until his quit from business in 2012 and engagement in politics with the beginning of the Syrian Civil War in 2011.

Mustafa is able to communicate proficiently in Turkish and Arabic. He also knows English.

References 

People of the Syrian civil war
Living people
1964 births
Syrian Turkmen politicians
People from Aleppo Governorate